Alfred Sloman (15 April 1874 – 27 August 1938) was a New Zealand cricketer. He played two first-class matches for Auckland in 1903/04.

See also
 List of Auckland representative cricketers

References

External links
 

1874 births
1938 deaths
New Zealand cricketers
Auckland cricketers
Cricketers from Auckland